Cyclobatis is an extinct genus of stingray-like skate from the Upper Cretaceous of what is now Lebanon. The genus is typified by a circular form. The ray measures about 10 cm or 20 cm. In life the environment of this creature was a warm shallow sea. This fish had a very short tail, fitted with a venomous stinger.

Two species are known. The shown, long-tailed Cyclobatis major and the short-tail Cyclobatis oligodactylus. Cyclobatis major can reach a length of about 25 cm, Cyclobatis oligodactylus around 15 cm

References

Cyclobatidae
Prehistoric cartilaginous fish genera
Cretaceous cartilaginous fish
Late Cretaceous fish of Asia
Fossil taxa described in 1844